Diviacka Nová Ves is a village and municipality in Prievidza District in the Trenčín Region of western Slovakia.

History
In historical records the village was first mentioned in 1270.
Diviacka Nova Ves is located in Prievidza, SE of Trencin. The last Jewish burial was in 1928. The urban isolated crown of a hill has no sign or marker. Reached by turning directly off a public road, access is open to all via a broken masonry wall without gate. 20-100 19th-20th century marble, granite, and sandstone tombstones, in original locations, are flat shaped tombstones or finely smoothed and inscribed stones with Hebrew and German inscriptions. The property is used for a garden. Adjacent properties are gardens. Private visitors stop rarely. Erosion and vandalism are moderate threats. Weather erosion is a minor threat.

Diviacka Nová Ves is a village and municipality in Prievidza District in the Trenčín Region of western Slovakia with a population of about 1754 people. burial list [January 2010]

Geography
The municipality lies at an altitude of 270 metres and covers an area of 13.369 km². It has a population of about 1754 people.
Diviacka Nová Ves Geographical coordinates Latitude: 48.75, Longitude: 18.5
48° 45′ 0″ North, 18° 30′ 0″ EastDiviacka Nová Ves Area 1,337 hectares
13.37 km² (5.16 sq mi)Diviacka Nová Ves Altitude 248 m
814 ftDiviacka Nová Ves Climate Humid continental climate (Köppen climate classification: Dfb)

Genealogical resources

The records for genealogical research are available at the state archive "Statny Archiv in Nitra, Slovakia"

 Roman Catholic church records (births/marriages/deaths): 1696-1784 (parish B)
 Lutheran church records (births/marriages/deaths): 1735-1950 (parish B)

See also
 List of municipalities and towns in Slovakia

References

External links

 
https://web.archive.org/web/20071116010355/http://www.statistics.sk/mosmis/eng/run.html
Surnames of living people in Diviacka Nova Ves

Villages and municipalities in Prievidza District